Vrućina gradskog asfalta is the second studio album by the Croatian hip hop duo, Tram 11. The album was released on December 19, 2000. Guest appearances on the album feature Prva Petorka, Ivana Husar, XL, Ink, Bolesna Braća (aka Sick Rhyme Sayazz), Čola, Ivana Kindl and Renman. The album includes production from Dash, Koolade and Baby Dooks.

Track listing

2000 albums
Tram 11 albums